The 1997–98 Scottish Second Division was won by Stranraer who, along with second placed Clydebank, were promoted to the First Division. Stenhousemuir and Brechin City were relegated to the Third Division.

Table

Top scorers

References 

 Scottish Football Archive

Scottish Second Division seasons
Scot
3